The F. L. Lukins House is a historic house in Artesia, New Mexico. It was built in 1906 for William Major, who later sold it to F. L. Lukins. The house was designed in the Queen Anne architectural style. It has been listed on the National Register of Historic Places since March 2, 1984.

References

Houses on the National Register of Historic Places in New Mexico
National Register of Historic Places in Eddy County, New Mexico
Queen Anne architecture in New Mexico
Houses completed in 1906
1906 establishments in New Mexico Territory